Benjamin Disraeli was appointed Prime Minister of the United Kingdom for a second time by Queen Victoria after William Ewart Gladstone's government was defeated in the 1874 general election. Disraeli's foreign policy was seen as immoral by Gladstone, and following the latter's Midlothian campaign, the government was heavily defeated in the 1880 general election, whereupon Gladstone formed his second government. The ailing Disraeli, by now created Earl of Beaconsfield, died in April 1881.

Cabinet

February 1874 – April 1880

† The Earl of Beaconsfield from August 1876.
§ The Earl Cairns from September 1878.
‡ The Viscount Cranbrook from May 1878.

Notes
The Earl of Beaconsfield served as both First Lord of the Treasury and Lord Privy Seal from August 1876 to April 1878.

Changes
August 1876: Beaconsfield succeeds the Earl of Malmesbury as Lord Privy Seal while remaining First Lord of the Treasury.
August 1877: George Ward Hunt dies and is succeeded as First Lord of the Admiralty by William Henry Smith. Sir Michael Hicks-Beach, the Chief Secretary for Ireland, enters the cabinet.
February 1878: Sir Michael Hicks-Beach succeeds the Earl of Carnarvon as Colonial Secretary. Hicks-Beach's successor as Chief Secretary for Ireland is not in the cabinet.
April 1878: The Duke of Northumberland succeeds Beaconsfield as Lord Privy Seal; the latter remains First Lord of the Treasury. The Marquess of Salisbury succeeds the Earl of Derby as Foreign Secretary. The Viscount Cranbrook succeeds Salisbury at the India Office. Sir Frederick Stanley succeeds Cranbrook at the War Office.

List of ministers
Cabinet members are listed in bold face.

Notes

References
C. Cook and B. Keith, British Historical Facts 1830–1900

British ministries
Government
Ministries of Queen Victoria
1870s in the United Kingdom
1874 establishments in the United Kingdom
1880s in the United Kingdom
1880 disestablishments in the United Kingdom
Ministry 2
Cabinets established in 1874
Cabinets disestablished in 1880